Two ships of the United States Navy have been named Doran, in honor of John James Doran, a Medal of Honor recipient from the Spanish–American War.

  was a  during World War II.

United States Navy ship names